Educating Essex is the first series of the British documentary television program Educating produced by Twofour for Channel 4 that ran for seven episodes from September to November 2011. It uses a fly on the wall format to show the everyday lives of the staff and pupils of Passmores Academy, a secondary school in Harlow, Essex, interspersed with interviews of those involved and featuring narration from the director and interviewer, David Clews.

The series received mixed media coverage: it was largely praised for its insight into the lives and behaviour of teenagers and the education system, but was also criticised for its depiction of pupils and teachers using profanity, as well as bullying and teenage pregnancy. The show received numerous awards, including director David Clews's British Academy Television Craft Award for his work on the programme in 2012; in the same year, the show was nominated for a Grierson Award for "Best Documentary Series".

In 2013, Channel 4 and Twofour announced that the next series of the programme would be filmed in a different school, Thornhill Community Academy in Dewsbury, and that it would accordingly be titled Educating Yorkshire.

In 2014, Stephen Drew starred in his own series, Mr Drew's School for Boys.

Episodes

Production 
Educating Essex was commissioned by Channel 4's commissioning editor for documentaries, Mark Raphael, after the channel pledged an extra £6.7 million to documentary programming in 2011. It is similar to other fly-on-the-wall series broadcast by Channel 4 such as One Born Every Minute, 24 Hours in A&E, The Hotel and The Family, the last of which both director David Clews and series producer Beejal-Maya Patel had previously worked on.

After seeing a "quite dull" programme about schools on the BBC, Raphael was inspired to create a series which captured school the way "[he] remembered it". He chose Clews after watching The Family, which he found funny, an attribute he wanted his series to have. Clews was initially not keen on the school idea, as he thought it would be boring. However, he came round after visiting some, describing in particular how one pupil tried to pass off his mobile phone use as checking for testicular cancer.

Passmores Academy in Essex was chosen as the series' setting after the production team approached around 20 schools with good or outstanding Ofsted reports. This was eventually narrowed down to three after many denied or governors blocked the proposals. One of the schools that denied was Houghton Kepier School in Durham which had been given bad press in years previous after misconduct from staff member Adam Walker. David Clews stated that, "Passmores was always my favourite" as he hoped for "stories unfolding within the school". Regarding his decision to allow cameras into the school, Goddard said that upon receiving the phone call about the show, he had just given an assembly which encouraged pupils to take opportunities after the death of a classmate, and thought it would be "disingenuous" not to do so himself. Goddard received the support of the majority of Passmores governors, in particular by Community Governor Michael Hardware who, with previous documentary experience, provided some reassurance. Teacher Stephen Drew has described how he was initially very distrustful of the crew, and thought they were all "bastards" with "no morals" and "no sense of ethics", only wanting to make money. He did, however, begin to trust the team when they were honest with him and did not "cut any corners".

In order to make the series, over 60 cameras were installed on the school's premises during the October half-term and filmed for a period of seven weeks, monitored by crew members in on-site prefabricated buildings. Staff and pupils were also allocated 22 radio microphones, based on whomever the crew thought would provide the most interesting material. When the speech of those not wearing a microphone was included, it was often barely audible and was written out and overlaid on the screen. In all, the fixed cameras filmed over 1,000 hours of footage. In addition, the crew interviewed pupils in prefabricated classrooms, mainly at lunchtime and in groups to capture the "group dynamic feel" of school life. Members of the production team were also charged with gaining the trust of around 20 to 25 pupils by liaising and going home with them.

The autumn period was chosen as the production team thought it the most "normal" part of the year because the syllabus was being taught and pupils were not revising for their GCSE exams. As for fears that the presence of cameras would impact on pupils' behaviour, Clews said that pupils "mucked about" for the first few days, but soon forgot about the unobtrusive cameras. However, Goddard did not want to have cameras back, in case pupils began to misbehave because they were there; he said, "There's no media interest better than one young person's education". Channel 4 sought a new school to be filmed for a second series, and chose Thornhill Community Academy in Dewsbury to be the setting for Educating Yorkshire, to be filmed and broadcast in 2013.

Themes 
The series covers a wide range of heavy themes, including a false accusation of assault against teacher Mr Drew by Camelita in the first episode, a case of bullying which moves on to cyberbullying against Gabby in the second, Vinni being taken into foster care in episode three and episode four focusing on Sky's teenage pregnancy with her boyfriend Liam. Episode five concentrated on the power of gossip and rumours, as Carrie's and Ashleigh's friendship breaks up and they reconcile. The sixth episode returns to Mr Drew as he attempts to get Mollie and her sister Charlotte back on the right academic track. The final episode features Ryan, a new arrival at the school, who has Asperger syndrome and the Year 11 leaving and their GCSE results.

Reception 
According to BARB, Educating Essex averaged around 2 million viewers for each episode. This included a peak of 2.11 million for episode 4, and episode 2 being the lowest with only 1.79 million viewers.

The series received generally positive reviews from critics: Sam Wollaston of The Guardian praised the show, calling it "a lot more interesting than Jamie's Dream School", and commenting that Mr Drew's history class is better than that of famous historian David Starkey; Wollaston also compared the series to the structured reality show The Only Way Is Essex, calling Educating Essex a "pure, observational, unobtrusive documentary [...] kind of what you want in reality TV". Rachel Tarley of Metro praised the first episode in particular due to its depiction of Mr Drew, calling it "giddily enjoyable", and said the show was "the best thing on Channel 4 this year".

However, the series and participating Passmores Academy were criticised by The Telegraph, who said that those involved were portrayed in "an unflattering light", and criticised incidents in which teacher Mr King jokingly calls his pupils "scumbags", head teacher Mr Goddard uses an offensive hand gesture towards Mr Drew, and staff use profane language with one another. Nick Seaton, a spokesman for the Campaign for Real Education, criticised Passmores and its Ofsted rating, saying "If this is an outstanding school then it doesn't say much for the rest".

Awards
In 2012 Educating Essex was shortlisted for the Broadcasting Press Guild Award for "Best Documentary Series", and director David Clews won a British Academy Television Craft Award in the "Director: Factual" category for his work on the programme; the show was also nominated for the BAFTA for "Factual Series" and the "Audience Award". Also in 2012, the show was awarded "Best New Television Series" at the Freesat Awards. Later on that year, senior producer–director Grace Reynolds won the award for "Producer or Director Debut" at the Guardian Edinburgh International Television Festival. In 2013, the programme won "Best Documentary Series" at the Broadcast Awards, and was also nominated for the Grierson Award for "Best Documentary Series".

References

External links 
 Educating Essex at Channel 4
 Educating Essex at Twofour
 

2010s British documentary television series
2011 British television seasons
Channel 4 documentary series
English-language television shows

British high school television series
Television series about educators
Television series about teenagers
Television shows set in Essex
Television series by ITV Studios